Francesco Paolo Salvemini (born 25 September 1996) is an Italian football player. He plays for  club Giugliano.

Club career
He made his Serie C debut for Fidelis Andria on 22 December 2012 in a game against Prato.

On 7 January 2019, he returned to Monopoli on loan.

References

External links
 

1996 births
People from Andria
Footballers from Apulia
Sportspeople from the Province of Barletta-Andria-Trani
Living people
Italian footballers
Association football forwards
S.S. Fidelis Andria 1928 players
A.C.R. Messina players
S.S. Akragas Città dei Templi players
S.S. Monopoli 1966 players
Potenza Calcio players
S.S.C. Giugliano players
Serie C players